"Love the Life" is the 1992 debut single by the Australian act Bass Culture, featuring vocalist and songwriter Gina Gardiner, who was credited as Geena before becoming more internationally known as Gina G. The single was taken from the group's debut album BC Nation, which was released in 1993. Although the single peaked outside the top 100 on the ARIA Charts, the song and its video (featuring the act performing in a field of sunflowers) would find renewed interest in the wake of Gina G's global success, prompting Mushroom Records to re-release the song and retitle Geena's billing to Gina G in 1996.

Track listing
Australian CD (1992):
 Love the Life (Radio Edit)  4:12  
 Love the Life (Dance Mix)  6:41  
 Love the Life (Rave Edit)  3:30  
 Love the Life (Rave Remix)  7:36  
 Love the Trance Remix  5:54

Australian CD (1996 remixes):
 Love the Life (Radio Edit)  4:08  
 Love the Life (Club Mix) 5:43  
 Love the Life (Pee Wee's Mix) 8:54  
 Love the Life (Ivan Gough's Mix) 7:30  
 Love the Life (The Hard Life Mix) 6:53

Chart performance

References

External links
 Music video from YouTube
 Song Lyrics

1992 songs
1992 debut singles
1996 singles
Gina G songs
Mushroom Records singles